Sweetleaf may refer to:
 Sauropus androgynus, a plant of the family Phyllanthaceae whose leaves may be used as a potherb
 Stevia, a genus of plants in the family Asteraceae whose leaves may be used for sweetening
 "Sweet Leaf", a song by Black Sabbath
 Sweet Leaf Tea Company, US manufacturer of prepared tea drinks
 Symplocos tinctoria, an evergreen shrub or small tree in the southeastern United States
 Monarda fistulosa, a medicinal and ornamental herb
 Slang term for Cannabis